Willbriggie is a community in the central part of the Riverina nearby to the city of Griffith. It is situated by road, about 16 kilometres north from Darlington Point and 17 kilometres south from Hanwood.

Darlington Point Railway Station Post Office opened on 16 November 1881, was renamed Darlington Railway Station office in 1882, Willbriggie in 1909 and closed in 1975.

Notes and references

Towns in the Riverina
Towns in New South Wales